Michael  or Mike Jefferson may refer to:

Michael Jefferson, a contestant from Survivor: One World
Mike Jefferson (American football) (born 1982), football wide receiver
Mike Danton (Michael Jefferson, born 1980), former ice hockey player